Carroll Wayne Dale (born April 24, 1938) is an American former professional football player who was a  wide receiver in the National Football League (NFL).  He was an All-American at Virginia Tech and was a member of the Green Bay Packers teams that won three straight NFL championships, including the first two Super Bowls. He was originally from Wise, Virginia.

Early life
He grew up in Wise, Virginia and played football for J. J. Kelly High School.

Career

College Football
Dale was a player for Virginia Tech from 1956-1959. He was named second-team All American in 1958 and 1959. and was Southern Conference Media player of the year in 1958.

Professional Football

He was selected in the 1960 NFL Draft by the Los Angeles Rams, the 86th overall pick, where he played for five years. On April 13, 1965, he was traded to the Green Bay Packers in exchange for linebacker Dan Currie. The speedy Dale was a very important contribution for the Packers' historic run of three consecutive NFL championships, which included Super Bowls I and II.  He played eight seasons in Green Bay, and after a year with the Minnesota Vikings, he retired from the NFL after the 1973 season, having amassed 438 receptions for 8,277 yards and 52 touchdowns and four rushes for 30 yards.

A deep-play threat, 's NFL off-season, Dale held at least three Packers franchise records, including:
 Most Yds/Rec (career): 19.72
 Most Yds/Rec (game): 46.5 (1970-09-27 ATL)
 Most Yds/Rec (playoff career): 18.41

College Athletics Administrator
Dale was named director of athletics at the University of Virginia's College at Wise in 1991.

Honors
Dale was inducted into the Virginia Sports Hall of Fame (the state-wide organization that recognizes athletic achievements by state natives, or who played or coached for teams in the state) in 1976, Green Bay Packers Hall of Fame in 1979 and into the College Football Hall of Fame in 1987. His number (84) was retired by Virginia Tech. and he was in the inaugural class of inductees to the Virginia Tech Sports Hall of Fame.

Carroll Dale Stadium, the football stadium of Dale's alma mater, J. J. Kelly High School, was named for him.

Dale currently resides in his birthplace, Wise, Virginia.

References

External links
 
 
 Sports Reference – college football statistics – Carroll Dale

1938 births
Living people
American football wide receivers
Green Bay Packers players
Los Angeles Rams players
Minnesota Vikings players
Virginia Tech Hokies football players
College Football Hall of Fame inductees
National Conference Pro Bowl players
Western Conference Pro Bowl players
People from Wise, Virginia